Che-Ming Ko (born 1943) is a Taiwanese physicist, focusing in nuclear theory, currently University Distinguished Professor  at Texas A&M University and an Elected Fellow of the American Physical Society in 1994.

Education 
Ko received a BS degree from Tunghai University in Taiwan. Ko received a MS degree from McMaster University in Canada. Ko received his Ph.D. in 1973 from State University of New York at Stony Brook, under dissertation advisor Gerald E. Brown.

References

Year of birth missing (living people)
Living people
Texas A&M University faculty
20th-century Taiwanese physicists
Tunghai University alumni
McMaster University alumni
Stony Brook University alumni
21st-century Taiwanese physicists
Taiwanese expatriates in the United States
Nuclear physicists
Taiwanese expatriates in Canada
Fellows of the American Physical Society